Juncus arcticus, called the arctic rush, is a species of flowering plant in the genus Juncus, native to the subarctic and subalpine northern hemisphere. It is typically found in wetland and riparian habitats.

Subtaxa
The following subspecies are currently accepted:
Juncus arcticus subsp. alaskanus Hultén – Alaska, northwest Canada
Juncus arcticus subsp. arcticus
Juncus arcticus subsp. grubovii (Novikov) Novikov, Kirschner & Snogerup – Mongolia, Tuva, Yakutia

References

arcticus
Plants described in 1799